The 2015 Men's Under 18 Australian Championships was a field hockey tournament held in the Victorian city of Melbourne from 8–16 April.

WA won the gold medal, defeating TAS 3–2 in the final. VIC Blue won the bronze medal by defeating QLD 6–3 in the third place playoff.

Teams

 ACT
 NSW Blue
 NSW State
 NT
 QLD
 SA
 TAS
 VIC Blue
 VIC White
 WA

Results

Preliminary round

Pool A

Pool B

Classification round

Fifth to tenth place classification

Pool C

First to fourth place classification

Semi-finals

Third and fourth place

Final

Statistics

Final standings

References

External links

2015 in Australian field hockey